The United Peoples' Democratic Party, shortened UDUB, was one of the three political parties in Somaliland. It was founded by president Egal in July 2001 in the preparation of the elections, which were originally scheduled for December 2001, but then postponed. It dissolved in December 2011 with its members joining other political parties. Two of Somaliland's first 3 presidents were from this party. The party was usually supported by some sub-clans of the Dir.

At the presidential elections, April 14, 2003, its candidate Dahir Riyale Kahin won 42.1% of the popular vote and was elected.

According to the final results of the 2005 parliamentary election, UDUB won 39.0% of the vote and 33 out of 82 seats, while the two opposition parties UCID and Kulmiye, won the rest of the seats.

History of leaders

Electoral history

Presidential elections

Parliament of Somaliland elections

Local elections

Notable people
 

Mohamed Ahmed Mohamud (1999), member of Parliament of Somaliland

See also
List of political parties in Somaliland

References

External links

Official website

Political parties in Somaliland
Islamic political parties in Somaliland
Islamic democratic political parties